Abacetus angustior is a species of ground beetle in the subfamily Pterostichinae. It was described by W.J.Macleay in 1871 and is an endemic species found in Queensland, Australia.

References

angustior
Beetles described in 1871
Beetles of Australia